Frongoch is a village located in Gwynedd, Wales. It lies close to the market town of Bala, on the A4212 road.

It was the home of the Frongoch internment camp, used to hold German prisoners-of-war during First World War, and then Irish Republican prisoners from the 1916 Rising.

History

Whisky
By the late 1800s, Frongoch was the main centre for whisky production in Wales. The distillery was bought by Scottish whisky companies and closed in 1910 when they were attempting to establish brands in England.

Prison camp 

A whisky distillery was built in the village in 1897, attracted by the purity of its water but went bankrupt by 1910. The former distillery buildings were requisitioned by the UK government and used as a prisoner of war camp for German prisoners during World War One . After the 1916 Easter Rising in Ireland it was used to imprison 500 of the Irish Volunteer Army rank and file. Among them were  Michael Collins and Arthur Griffith .

Railway station

Frongoch railway station was on the Bala Ffestiniog Line. It closed to passenger services on 2 January 1960 and freight services on 27 January 1961. The station building and signal box are now in use as a private residence. It was converted to a holiday home during the early 1970s. The main station had a small extension added to the end to house a bathroom and the large warehouse was demolished to make way for several homes.

Cwmtirmynach Chapel
It was built in 1826 and rebuilt in 1880 in the Lombardic/Italian style of the gable-entry type. The folk singer Robert Roberts (Bob Tai'r Felin) was precentor at the chapel for nearly 50 years. There is weekly worship and the current minister is Hywel Edwards.

Education 
There is a Welsh-medium primary school, Ysgol Bro Tryweryn, in the village. There were 58 pupils aged between 3 and 11 years on roll in 2017. As of January 2018, the school had the highest percentage of pupils (aged 5 and over) who spoke Welsh fluently at home in Wales, at 97.4%.

References

External links 

www.geograph.co.uk : photos of Fron-goch and surrounding area

Villages in Gwynedd
Llandderfel
Villages in Snowdonia